The Andrew P. Hansen Farmstead is a collection of historic domestic and agricultural buildings located northwest of Brayton, Iowa, United States. Hansen was born in Fyn, Denmark, and was five years old when the family immigrated to the United States, settling in Avoca, Iowa. He worked for the Chicago, Rock Island and Pacific Railroad there before buying his first  from the railroad. It was listed on the National Register of Historic Places in 1991. At the time of its nomination the farm included five contributing buildings including the transverse-frame dairy barn (1894), the hog house (c. 1895), the 1½-story American Foursquare house (1901), the Midwest three portal cattle barn (1903), and a garage (1910s). It also includes one contributing structure, the double corn crib (c. 1912–1913). The house and the barns are characteristic of the building trends that are associated with Danish immigrants during the period of significance, in this case 1894–1924.

References

Infrastructure completed in 1894
Infrastructure completed in 1903
Houses completed in 1901
Buildings and structures in Audubon County, Iowa
National Register of Historic Places in Audubon County, Iowa
Farms on the National Register of Historic Places in Iowa